The Winding Chimney (Danish: Den Snoede Skorsten) is a 56 m tall disused Carlsberg chimney, now serving as a landmark in the Carlsberg neighbourhood of Copenhagen, Denmark.

History

Passionately interested in the arts, Carl Jacobsen, who had founded his New Carlsberg Brewery a decade prior, taking up competition with his father, wanted to show that a chimney for an industrial plant could be beautiful. He made his own rough sketches and brought in architect Vilhelm Dahlerup and master builder PS Beckmann. The chimney was completed in 1900.
 The chimney was decommissioned in 1980 after a new taller chimney had been built.

Design
Built in red brick and granite, the chimney turns around its own axis and stands on an octagonal plinth. The Chimeras (Gargoyles) are replicas of those on Notre Dame in Paris while the upper part of the chimney is decorated with motifs of Egyptian lotus flowers.

See also
 Jesus Church

References

External links
 Carlsberg district (in Danish)

Towers completed in 1900
Chimneys in Denmark
Carlsberg (district)